Ferdynand Feldman (1862–1919) was a theater actor known from Polish scenes at the turn of the 19th and 20th century.

Biography

Feldman studied at the Jan Matejko Academy of Fine Arts in Kraków, after at the Derynga drama school in Warsaw. From 1881, he appeared in the Krakow theater, playing first the role of footmen. Due to his  hort and stock posture , he was initially successful in comedies, farces and operettas.

Feldman played in garden theaters, in Warsaw, Kraków, Poznań, Lublin, Częstochowa and Łódź. In 1890 he was involved in the ensemble of the Grand Theater in Lwów (Lemberg), where he performed for twenty-five years. In the years 1916–19 he worked in the Juliusz Słowacki Theatre in Kraków.

He probably took part in the Polish-Ukrainian battle of Lemberg (Lwów, Lviv), (in Polish historiography known also as defense of Lwów), standing on the Polish side (his wife was Polish).

The attention of the critics was caught by his creations in the works of Aleksander Fredro (he played Benet, Chamberlain, Geldhab and Radost). Feldman often played the character of Napoleon Bonaparte and  Tadeusz Pawlikowski, however, started casting the actor in dramatic roles, which allowed Feldman to develop his talent. His biggest roles are Bos in Hope and Bezsiemionow in Mieszczanach. The actor was characterized by a great diction, using gestures and facial expressions, he significantly differentiated his characters, built a character using small details and props.

Personal life

Ferdynand Feldman was a Polish Jew, and before his marriage to opera singer Katarzyna Sawicka at Saint Nicholas Church in Lwów, he accepted the Catholic baptism and converted to Roman Catholicism. He was also father of actress Krystyna Feldman.

He is buried at the Lychakiv Cemetery.

References

External links
 http://www.e-teatr.pl/pl/osoby/39476.html

1862 births
1919 deaths
Male actors from Kraków
Burials at Lychakiv Cemetery
Polish male stage actors
Converts to Roman Catholicism from Judaism
19th-century Polish Jews
Polish Roman Catholics